Pedro de Cristo (1545/1550 – 12 December 1618) was a Portuguese composer of Renaissance music. He is one of the most important Portuguese polyphonists of the 16th and 17th centuries.

Life
Pedro de Cristo was born in Coimbra, and in 1571 entered Santa Cruz monastery at Coimbra. He spent time at Monastery of São Vicente de Fora in Lisbon.  He died in Coimbra.

Works
(alphabetical order - incomplete)

Ave Maria à 8
Ave maris stella
Ay mi Dios
Beata viscera Mariae
Beate martir
Dum complerentur dies Pentecostes
Es nascido
Hodie nobis
In manus tuas
Magnificat à 8
O magnum mysterium
Osanna filio David
Quaeramus cum pastoribus
Regina coeli
Salva nos Domine
Sanctissimi quinque martires
Sanctorum meritis
Tristis est anima mea

External links

16th-century births
1618 deaths
Renaissance composers
Portuguese classical composers
People from Coimbra
16th-century Portuguese people
17th-century Portuguese people
Portuguese male classical composers